Doriot, Flandrin & Parant (D.F.P.) was a French car maker based in Courbevoie, Seine between 1906 and 1926.

Auguste Doriot and Ludovic Flandrin had both worked for Peugeot and then Clément-Bayard before setting up their own car making company in 1906.  Their main product was a single cylinder light car and was sold as a Doriot-Flandrin.

In 1908 they were joined by Alexandre and Jules-René Parant and a new company was formed including all the names. Four-cylinder models were now made with Chapuis-Dornier engines alongside the single-cylinder cars. The singles were discontinued in 1910 and a smaller 1592 cc four joined the line up.

D.F.P. started to make their own engines in 1912. The 2-litre 12/15 was used by W. O. Bentley in a tuned version with aluminium alloy pistons to race at Brooklands. The aluminium pistons were fitted to some 12/40 hp production cars from 1914. This car also had electric starting.

After World War I D.F.P. started to fit their cars with proprietary engines mainly from both Altos and Sargant.

In 1923 they started to make their own engines again fitting them to the 1924 cc 13/50 model. A new light car was also introduced as the D.F. Petite with 1098 cc made by C.I.M.E..

All production finished in 1926 and the factory was sold to light car maker Lafitte but they in turn closed in 1928.

Car Models

1906-10 : Type 6cv ("Chapuis-Dornier" single-cylinder 1.1-litre)
1906-10 : Type 8cv ("Chapuis-Dornier" single-cylinder 1.1-litre)
1907-10 : Type 10cv ("Chapuis-Dornier" 4-cylinder 2.0-litre)
1908-12 : Type 12cv ("Chapuis-Dornier" 4-cylinder 2.4-litre)
1908-12 : Type 14cv ("Chapuis-Dornier" 4-cylinder 2.8-litre)
1911-14 : Type "10/12" ("Chapuis-Dornier" 4-cylinder 1.6-litre)
1911-14 : Type "25/30" ("Chapuis-Dornier" 6-cylinder)
1912-14 : Type "12/15" ("D.F.P" 4-cylinder 2.0-litre)
1912-14 : Type "12/16" ("D.F.P" 4-cylinder 2.8-litre)
1913-14 : Type "16/22" ("D.F.P" 4-cylinder 3.0-litre)
1914 : Type "12/40" Sport ("D.F.P" 6-cylinder 3.3-litre)
1919-22 : series 2000 Type 7cv ("Alto" 4-cylinder 1.1-litre)
1919-22 : series 2000 Type 10cv ("Sargant" 4-cylinder 1.6-litre)
1919-22 : series 2000 Type 12cv ("Alto" 4-cylinder 2.0-litre)
1922-26 : series A.D.M Type "10/12" ("American" 4-cylinder 1.6-litre)
1923-26 : series A.D.M Type "13/50" ("D.F.P" 4-cylinder 2.0-litre)
1924-33 : series V/VA Type 7cv DF ("D.F.P" 4-cylinder 1.1-litre)

References

Donnet
Vehicle manufacturing companies established in 1906
French companies established in 1906